Thomas Hamilton, 3rd Earl of Haddington (1626 – 8 February 1645) was a short-lived Scottish nobleman.

Life
Haddington was born in 1626, eldest son of Thomas Hamilton, 2nd Earl of Haddington and Lady Catherine Erskine, daughter of John Erskine, Earl of Mar and Lady Marie Stewart.

Lord Haddington was a minor when he succeeded his father. The latter having been killed in an explosion at Dunglass Castle during the Bishops' Wars.
Haddington travelled to the continent to further his education. While in France he met Henriette de Coligny, daughter to Gaspard de Coligny, Duc de Châtillon, Marshal of France. Henriette de Coligny was eight years senior to Haddington, but nevertheless a marriage was contracted between them in 1643.

Haddington and his bride returned to Scotland, where he involved himself with the Covenanters. Haddington died, while still underage, of consumption on 8 February 1645, without issue. His countess returned to France where she remarried to Gaspard de Champagne, Comte de la Suze, and died in 1673.

Lord Haddington was succeeded by his brother John Hamilton, 4th Earl of Haddington.

References

Notes

Sources
 Anderson, J., Historical and genealogical memoirs of the House of Hamilton; with genealogical memoirs of the several branches of the family, Edinburgh 1825.
 Balfour Paul, Sir J., Scots Peerage IX vols. Edinburgh 1904.

1626 births
1645 deaths
3
17th-century Scottish people
17th-century deaths from tuberculosis
Tuberculosis deaths in Scotland